Suqovuşan (known as Gedəmiş or Gedamish until 1992) is a village in the municipality of Zinzahal in the Dashkasan Rayon of Azerbaijan.

References

Populated places in Dashkasan District